Roberto Legaspi del Rosario (June 7, 1919 – July 30, 2003) was a Filipino entrepreneur who is best known as the patentholder of the Sing Along System, a type of karaoke system he developed in 1975. Due to the fact that he was the first to patent a karaoke system, he is often erroneously referred to as the inventor of karaoke. However, Daisuke Inoue created a karaoke system four years earlier, in 1971.

Patent rights to Karaoke
Del Rosario held the patent to the Sing Along System, a type of karaoke system which he developed in 1975. He filed a patent infringement case against a Chinese company before the Supreme Court. In 1996, the court ruled that the Chinese company violated his patent rights. He was recognized as the sole holder of a patent for a karaoke system in the world. However, most scholars credit Daisuke Inoue, a Japanese, as the inventor of the karaoke. Inoue invented the karaoke in 1971.

Other works
 One-Man Band (OMB)
 Voice Color Tapes
 Sing-Along System (SAS)
 Method of Determining a Singer's Voice Range

See also
List of Filipino inventions and discoveries
National Scientist of the Philippines
Science and technology in the Philippines
Web accessibility initiatives in the Philippines
Daisuke Inoue

References

External links

Filipino inventors
Science and technology in the Philippines
People from Manila
1919 births
2003 deaths